Pterolophia collartiana is a species of beetle in the family Cerambycidae. It was described by Stephan von Breuning in 1962.

References

compacta
Beetles described in 1962